Karl Dominik (Chinese name: Kaier, 凯洱, pinyin: Kǎiěr, lit. "Triumphant River"; born March 2, 1980) is a Polish–Canadian actor, host, model and author. Originally from Łódź, Poland, he studied acting in Canada in 1996, and started his acting career in China in 2006.

He created an organization to help actors create a community and share information and knowledge, the Shanghai Actors Association. Also many other more focused interest groups were formed through this vessel, such as the East West Theater Company of Shanghai.

As of September 6, 2009, the Shanghai Actors Association has been shelved due to focusing on other projects such as his talent agency, Constellation Talent Agency, which strives to offer a professional, comprehensive, equal opportunity solution for those in need of foreign talent in China.

References

External links
 Shanghai Actors Association 
 Constellation Talent Agency

People from Burlington, Ontario
Chinese television presenters
Canadian expatriates in China
Polish emigrants to Canada
1980 births
Living people
Polish male actors
Actors from Łódź